William Voorhees Judson (16 February 1865 – 29 March 1923) was an American brigadier general, who served as a military aide with the Root Mission to the Russian Provisional Government.

Early life and education 
William Voorhees Judson was born to Charles E. Judson and Abby Cady Voorhees Judson in Indianapolis, Indiana, on the February 16, 1865. He attended Harvard University for two years before being admitted into the United States Military Academy, from which he graduated third in his class in 1888. James W. McAndrew, Peyton C. March, Robert Lee Howze, John Louis Hayden, Peter Charles Harris, Edward Anderson, William Robert Dashiell, William M. Morrow and Eli Alva Helmick were among his fellow classmates who would, like Judson himself, ultimately attain general officer rank.

Military career 
Following his graduation from USMA, Judson then attended the Army Engineering School of Application, which he graduated from in 1891. Following that, he served as an assistant engineer in various postings; at Lake Erie, on the upper Mississippi River, and in Galveston, Texas. In July 1899, he was promoted to Chief Engineer and President of the Board of Public Works of Puerto Rico, where he served until August 1900.

Following that, Judson served in a variety of engineering capacities until 1917. Notable postings included that as an instructor at the U.S. Army Engineer School, as the Engineer Commissioner for Washington, D.C., and as the Assistant Division Engineer for the Atlantic side of the Panama Canal. Judson also was sent as a military observer to the Russo-Japanese War from 1904 to 1905, when he returned to the US as a result of the Russian defeat. From 1905 to 1909, he supervised maintenance and improvement of harbors and lighthouses on the western shore of Lake Michigan. In 1909, he was awarded a patent for a buoyant steel-reinforced concrete caisson for use in harbor construction. During this time, he also received an honorary M.A. from Harvard in 1911.

On April 6, 1917, the day of the American entry into World War I, Judson returned to Russia as part of Root Mission, headed by Elihu Root. Following Root's return to the U.S. three months later, Judson remained in Russia as head of the Root Mission itself before being detached as a military attaché to the American embassy in Petrograd and chief of the American military mission to Russia until Spring 1918. During this time, he conducted the first face-to-face meeting between a US diplomatic representative and a Bolshevik leader when he met with Leon Trotsky on December 1, 1918.

Upon his return, Judson was placed in command of the 38th Infantry Division at Camp Shelby until August 1918. From September to December 1918, Judson commanded the New York Port of Embarkation. For his services during the war he was awarded the Army Distinguished Service Medal, the citation for which reads:

Judson spent the remainder of his career working as the district engineer in Chicago, Illinois, retiring in August 1922 due to disabilities.

Personal life 
Judson married Alice Carneal Clay in 1891. They had one son, Clay Judson.

Death and legacy 
Judson died on March 29, 1923. He is buried at Arlington National Cemetery with his wife.
Judson wrote many letters and documents as a military attaché in Petrograd, which are considered to be of historical value. A book, Russia in War and Revolution: General William V. Judson's Accounts from Petrograd, 1917–1918 has been written on the basis of Judson's materials.

References

External links
 valor.militarytimes.com
 William Voorhees Judson Papers at Newberry Library

1865 births
1923 deaths
People from Indianapolis
Harvard University alumni
United States Military Academy alumni
Military personnel from Indiana
People of the Russo-Japanese War
20th-century American inventors
United States Army generals of World War I
American military personnel of the Russian Civil War
United States Army generals
Recipients of the Distinguished Service Medal (US Army)
Burials at Arlington National Cemetery
United States military attachés